Piperade (Gascon and French) or piperrada (Basque and Spanish), from piper (pepper in Gascon and in Basque), is a typical Basque dish prepared with onion, green peppers, and tomatoes sautéd and flavoured with red Espelette pepper. The colours coincidentally reflect the colours of the Basque flag (red, green and white). It may be served as a main course or as a side dish. Typical additions include egg, garlic or meats such as ham.

Notes

References
  Larousse Gastronomique (1998). Paris: Larousse-Bordas.

External links
Piperade recipe on the BBC website

Basque cuisine
Spanish soups and stews